Benzilone is an antimuscarinic drug.

References

Muscarinic antagonists
Quaternary ammonium compounds
Pyrrolidines
Tertiary alcohols
Benzilate esters